Overall performance of Cape Verde in the Lusophone Games.

Medal table by sports

Participation by year 
 2006
 2009

Sport in Cape Verde
Nations at the Lusofonia Games